Clepsigenes dissota is a moth in the family Xyloryctidae, and the only species in the genus Clepsigenes. The genus and species were both described by Edward Meyrick in 1930 and are found in New Guinea.

References

Xyloryctidae
Xyloryctidae genera
Monotypic moth genera
Taxa named by Edward Meyrick